Nabila Espanioly is a Palestinian-Israeli psychologist, social worker, feminist, and peace activist. She is the founder and director of the Al-Tufula Center in Nazareth.

Early life and education 
Espanioly grew up in a communist family in Nazareth, and was involved in the Nazareth branch of the Movement of Democratic Women in Israel beginning as a child.

Espanioly received a B.A. in Social Work from the University of Haifa, and an M.A. in Psychology from the University of Bamberg.

Career

Political activity 
Espanioly became active in the Israeli women’s movement during the First Intifada. As a member of the Haifa Feminist Center and a well-known Palestinian-Israeli feminist, she appeared regularly on Israeli national news programs. She advocated for the formation of groups for Palestinian women within larger Israeli women's organizations, notably supporting the concept at Israeli feminist conferences in 1994 and 1995, while also emphasizing her view that women are "united by [their] oppression."

After the 2008-2009 Gaza War, Espanioly participated in protests led by the Israeli Communist Party and by pacifists, and worked with local women's cells of the Party to organize humanitarian aid for the Palestinians in the Gaza Strip.

Espanioly ran an unsuccessful campaign for the Knesset as a member of Hadash in 2013. She was also involved in the founding of the Mossawa Center, which later presented her an award for her activism.

Al-Tufula Center 
Espanioly is the founder and director of the Al-Tufula Center in Nazareth, which works to support early childhood education for Palestinian families. She founded the Center in the late 1980s.

References

Bibliography

External links 
Al-Tufula Center

Clinical psychologists
Israeli social workers
Hadash politicians
University of Haifa alumni
University of Bamberg alumni
Living people
Year of birth missing (living people)
Palestinian communists
Israeli communists
Palestinian feminists
Israeli feminists